A Very Private War is a 1980 novel by Australian writer Jon Cleary about coastwatchers during World War II.

Plot
Mullane, an American coast watcher in New Britain, goes on a mission to uncover the camouflage of the airstrip of a Japanese base. He is accompanied by an Australian officer and captured Japanese officer. Mullane gets the chance to avenge the death of his Japanese wife, killed prior to the war.

Reception
The Sydney Morning Herald wrote "Cleary is neither a stylist nor a profound writer. He is essentially a storyteller, and very good one, most at home in the fields of action and adventure, as A Very Private War demonstrates", calling it "a straightforward, uncomplicated tale of wartime derring-do."

References

External links
A Very Private War at AustLit (subscription required)

Novels by Jon Cleary
1980 Australian novels
William Collins, Sons books
William Morrow and Company books
Novels set during World War II
Novels set on islands
Novels set in Oceania